Panel buildings may refer to buildings of one of the following types:

Built of structural insulated panels
Built of pre-fabricated concrete blocks, named differently in various countries.
Large Panel System building, often called Plattenbau from German or Panelák from Czech and Slovak, Blok from Polish or Panelház in Hungarian. Most, but not all Khrushchyovka houses in the former Soviet Union are also constructed using this technology.

Panel buildings can be either frameless (column-less), or the panels can be fitted to:
 Timber-, steel- or reinforced concrete-framed buildings,
 over common blockwork,
 or over existing masonry products.

See also 
Prefabricated building

Buildings and structures by type
Prefabricated buildings